, who was previously known as , is a Japanese actress. She won the award for Best Supporting Actress at the 21st Hochi Film Awards for Shall We Dance?.

Filmography

Films
Comic Magazine (1986)
Crest of Betrayal (1994)
Shall We Dance? (1996)
Swing Girls (2004) - Sanae Suzuki
Memories of Tomorrow (2006)
Ichi (2008)
Lady Maiko (2014)
My Dad and Mr. Ito (2016)
Survival Family (2017)
Mary and the Witch's Flower (2017) - Banks (voice)
Talking the Pictures (2019)
Tezuka's Barbara (2019)
Romance Doll (2019)
Labyrinth of Cinema (2020)

Television
Oshin (1983)
Amachan (2013)

References

External links

JMDb Profile (in Japanese)

1955 births
Living people
Japanese actresses
Actors from Yamagata Prefecture